The Daszawa gas field in Poland was discovered in 1950. It began production in 1950 and produces natural gas. The total proven reserves of the Daszawa gas field are around 72 billion cubic feet (2×109m³).

References

Energy in Poland
Natural gas fields in Poland